Terence Tchiknavorian  (born 22 April 1992) is a French freestyle skier.

Career
He competed at the 2018 and 2022 Winter Olympics.

References

External links

1992 births
Living people
French male freestyle skiers
Olympic freestyle skiers of France
Freestyle skiers at the 2018 Winter Olympics
Freestyle skiers at the 2022 Winter Olympics
Sportspeople from Avignon